The brown water snake (Nerodia taxispilota) is a large species of nonvenomous natricine snake endemic to the southeastern United States. This snake is often one of the most abundant species of snakes found in rivers and streams of the southeastern United States, yet many aspects of its natural history is poorly known. Due to abundance and distribution throughout its biological range, this species could be used to investigate anthropogenic impacts on aquatic ecosystems by studying their movements. 

Lycodonomorphus rufulus is sometimes also called the brown water snake, but L. rufulus is found in South Africa.

Common names
Its common names include brown water snake, water-pilot, aspic, false moccasin, great water snake, pied water snake, southern water snake, and water rattle.

Geographic range
N. taxispilota is found in lower coastal regions from southeastern Virginia, through North Carolina, South Carolina, and Georgia, to northern and western Florida (Gulf Coast), then west through Missouri, Alabama, and Mississippi, to Louisiana, normally from sea level to 500 ft. (150 m) elevation.

Description
The brown water snake is very heavy-bodied, and its neck is distinctly narrower than its head. Dorsally, it is brown or rusty brown with a row of about 25 black or dark brown, square blotches down its back. Smaller similar blotches alternate on the sides. Ventrally, it is yellow, heavily marked with black or dark brown. Dorsal scales are in 27-33 rows (more than any other North American water snake), and it has two to four anterior temporals (usually one in others). Adults measure 30–60 in. (76–152 cm) in total length; record 69 in. (175 cm).

Habitat
N. taxispilota is found in swamps and streams and is often mistaken for a moccasin.

Reproduction
N. taxispilota is ovoviviparous. Mating takes place in the spring on land or on tree branches. On average, adult females are larger than adult males. The young are born alive, usually in August, in broods of 14–58, more commonly 30–40.  The newborns are 7-10¾ in (18–27 cm) long, with males longer than females, opposite of adults.

References

Further reading
Conant, R., and W. Bridges (1939). What Snake Is That? A Field Guide to the Snakes of the United States East of the Rocky Mountains. (with 108 drawings by Edmond Malnate). New York and London: D. Appleton-Century. Frontispiece map + viii + 163 pp. + Plates A-C, 1-32. (Natrix taxispilota, pp. 106–107 + Plate 20, Figure 58).
Morris, P.A. (1948). Boy's Book of Snakes: How to Recognize and Understand Them. A volume of the Humanizing Science Series, edited by Jacques Cattell. New York: Ronald Press. viii + 185 pp. ("The Brown Water Snake", pp. 84–85, 180).
Powell, R., R. Conant, and J.T. Collins (2016). Peterson Field Guide to Reptiles and Amphibians of Eastern and Central North America, Fourth Edition. Boston and New York: Houghton Mifflin Harcourt. xiv + 494 pp., 47 plates, 207 figures. . (Nerodia taxispilota, pp. 420–422, Figure 191 + Plate 41).
Holbrook, J.E. (1842). North American Herpetology; or, a Description of the Reptiles Inhabiting the United States, Vol. IV. Philadelphia: J. Dobson. 138 pp. (Tropidonotus taxispilotus, new species, pp. 35–36 & Plate VIII).

External links
Savannah River Ecology Laboratory, Herpetology Program. "Featured Herp: Brown Water Snake (Nerodia taxispilota)"

Nerodia
Extant Pleistocene first appearances
Reptiles described in 1842
Fauna of the Southeastern United States
Reptiles of the United States
Taxa named by John Edwards Holbrook